Arthur Emmett (1869 – 12 November 1935) was an English cricketer. He was the third of six children of Tom Emmett and Grace Emmett.

Emmett was a medium pace bowler who played three first-class matches for Leicestershire County Cricket Club during the 1902 English cricket season. He returned his best figures of 3/48 against London County at Aylestone Road, Leicester, where his victims included the former Australian captain, Billy Murdoch. His third and final appearance was at Lord's against the Marylebone Cricket Club.

Emmett's father, Tom, captained Yorkshire between 1878 and 1882, and played seven Test matches for England, including the inaugural Test match in 1877.

He died on 12 November 1935 in Evington, Leicestershire.

References

1869 births
1935 deaths
English cricketers
Leicestershire cricketers